James Bishop (May 11, 1816 in New Brunswick, New Jersey – May 10, 1895 in Morristown, New Jersey) was an American Opposition Party politician, who represented  in the United States House of Representatives from 1855–1857.

Biography

Bishop was born in New Brunswick, New Jersey on May 11, 1816. He attended Spaulding School and Rutgers Preparatory School in New Brunswick. He engaged in mercantile pursuits in New Brunswick, and was a member of the New Jersey General Assembly in 1849 and 1850.

Bishop was elected as an Opposition Party candidate to the Thirty-fourth Congress, serving in office from March 4, 1855 – March 3, 1857, but was an unsuccessful candidate for reelection in 1856 to the Thirty-fifth Congress.

Bishop House, erected in 1852 and located at 115 College Avenue in New Brunswick, is a 42-room mansion that constitutes a fine representation of the Italianate style of architecture, was built for Bishop. The house was placed on the National Register of Historic Places in 1976.
After leaving Congress, he was prominent in the rubber trade in New York City. He was chief of the bureau of labor statistics of New Jersey from 1878–1893 and was a resident of Trenton. He died at Kemble Hall, near Morristown, New Jersey on May 10, 1895, and was interred in Elmwood Cemetery in North Brunswick.

References

External links

James Bishop at The Political Graveyard

1816 births
1895 deaths
Politicians from New Brunswick, New Jersey
Opposition Party members of the United States House of Representatives from New Jersey
New Jersey Oppositionists
Members of the New Jersey General Assembly
Politicians from Trenton, New Jersey
Rutgers Preparatory School alumni
19th-century American politicians
Burials at Elmwood Cemetery (North Brunswick, New Jersey)
Members of the United States House of Representatives from New Jersey